The following is a list of courts and tribunals in New South Wales:

List of sitting boards, commissions, courts, and tribunals

Sitting courts 
The primary courts currently sitting in New South Wales are: 
Court of Appeal of New South Wales
Court of Criminal Appeal of New South Wales
Supreme Court of New South Wales
Land and Environment Court of New South Wales
District Court of New South Wales
Local Court of New South Wales
Additional, specialist courts include: 
Chief Industrial Magistrate's Court
Children's Court of New South Wales
Children's Court Clinic
Coroner's Court of New South Wales
Court of Disputed Returns of New South Wales
Court of Marine Inquiry of New South Wales
Drug Court of New South Wales
Warden Court
Youth Drug and Alcohol Court of New South Wales

Youth Koori Court

Sitting tribunals 
Dust Diseases Tribunal of New South Wales
Government and Related Employees Tribunal of New South Wales
Independent Pricing and Regulatory Tribunal of New South Wales
Marine Appeal Tribunal
Mental Health Review Tribunal of New South Wales
New South Wales Civil and Administrative Tribunal

Sitting boards and councils

New South Wales Sentencing Council
Transport Appeal Boards of New South Wales

Sitting commissions

Independent Commission Against Corruption 
Industrial Relations Commission of New South Wales
Judicial Commission of New South Wales
Workers Compensation Commission of New South Wales

List of abolished boards, courts and tribunals

Abolished boards

Coal Compensation Board of New South Wales
Local Land Boards

Abolished courts

Compensation Court of New South Wales (1984–2004)
Court of Arbitration (New South Wales) (1902–1908)
Court of Industrial Arbitration of New South Wales (1912–1926)
Court of Civil Jurisdiction (1787–1814)
Court of Coal Mines Regulation of New South Wales (1984–2006)
Court of Criminal Jurisdiction (1787–1823)
Governors Court (1814–1823)
Industrial Court of New South Wales (1908–1912)
Industrial Court of New South Wales (1996–2016)
Lieutenant Governor's Court (Van Dieman's Land) (1814–1823)
Land and Valuation Court of New South Wales (1921–1979)
Supreme Court of Civil Judicature (1814–1824)
Supreme Court of New South Wales for the District of Port Phillip (1840–1852)
Vice Admiralty Court (New South Wales) (1823–1970)
Warden's Court (1874–2009)
Youth Drug and Alcohol Court of New South Wales (2000–2012)

Abolished tribunals

Aboriginal and Torres Strait Islander Health Practice Tribunal
Aboriginal Land Councils Pecuniary Interest and Disciplinary Tribunal
Administrative Decisions Tribunal of New South Wales
Charity Referees
Chinese Medicine Tribunal
Chiropractic Tribunal
Coal Compensation Review Tribunal of New South Wales
Community Services Appeals Tribunal
Compensation Court of New South Wales
Consumer, Trader and Tenancy Tribunal of New South Wales
Dental Tribunal
Fair Trading Tribunal of New South Wales
Gaming Tribunal of New South Wales
Government and Related Employees Appeals Tribunal of New South Wales
Guardianship Tribunal of New South Wales
Local Government Pecuniary Interest Tribunal of New South Wales
Marine Appeal Tribunal
Medical Radiation Practice Tribunal
Medical Tribunal of New South Wales
Nursing and Midwifery Tribunal
Occupational Therapy Tribunal
Optometry Tribunal
Osteopathy Tribunal
Pharmacy Tribunal
Physiotherapy Tribunal
Podiatry Tribunal
Police Tribunal of New South Wales
Psychology Tribunal
Residential Tribunal of New South Wales
Victims Compensation Tribunal of New South Wales
Vocational Training Appeals Panel

References

Lists of courts and tribunals in Australia

Courts and tribunals